Philiris is a genus of butterflies in the family Lycaenidae. The species of this genus are found in the Australasian realm (New Guinea, Bismarck Islands, Molucca Islands and eastern Australia). Philiris was erected by Julius Röber in 1891.
It is a speciose genus; Tite decided on 56 species, Sands added 11 species and placed the taxa into 21 species groups (broadly accepted by Parsons  Most species are on New Guinea.Tite considered Philiris and Candalides Hübner, 1819 to be sisters. Eliot (1973) placed Philiris in Luciini Waterhouse & Lyell, 1914,

Species
Philiris agatha
Philiris albicostalis
Philiris albihumerata
Philiris albiplaga
Philiris amethysta
Philiris angabunga
Philiris apicalis
Philiris aquamarina
Philiris argenteus
Philiris azula
Philiris baiteta 
Philiris biplaga
Philiris bubalisatina 
Philiris cadmica
Philiris caelestis
Philiris cyana
Philiris diana
Philiris dinawa
Philiris doreia
Philiris elegans
Philiris fulgens
Philiris gloriosa
Philiris harterti
Philiris helena
Philiris hemileuca
Philiris hindenburgensis 
Philiris hypoxantha
Philiris ianthina
Philiris ignobilis
Philiris ilias
Philiris innotatus
Philiris intensa
Philiris kumusiensis
Philiris lavendula
Philiris lucescens
Philiris maculata
Philiris marginata
Philiris mayri
Philiris melanacra
Philiris misimensis
Philiris moira
Philiris moluccana
Philiris montigena
Philiris nitens
Philiris oreas
Philiris pagwi
Philiris parsonsi 
Philiris petriei 
Philiris phengotes
Philiris philotas
Philiris philotoides
Philiris praeclara
Philiris putih
Philiris radicala
Philiris refusa 
Philiris remissa
Philiris satis
Philiris scintillata
Philiris siassi
Philiris sibatanii
Philiris subovata
Philiris tapini
Philiris tombara
Philiris unipunctata
Philiris vicina
Philiris violetta
Philiris zadne
Philiris ziska

References

External links

"Philiris Röber, 1891" at Markku Savela's Lepidoptera and Some Other Life Forms

Luciini
Lycaenidae genera
Taxa named by Julius Röber